Chiari may refer to:

Chiari (surname)
Chiari, Lombardy, a commune in Italy
The Chiari Institute, a medical institution in Great Neck, New York
Battle of Chiari (1701), part of the War of the Spanish Succession

See also
 Arnold–Chiari malformation, a malformation of the brain
 Chari (disambiguation)
 Chieri (disambiguation)